The poem "Jeanie Deans" was written by Carolina Oliphant (Lady Nairne) (1766–1845). It eulogizes Jeanie Deans, the heroine of Sir Walter Scott's 1818 novel, The Heart of Midlothian. However, it appears to be unfinished as it ends with Jeanie 'wending' her way to London where she later obtains the pardon she seeks from the Queen for her sister and the story does not end there. For the full story see Jeanie Deans.

References 

Scottish poems
Adaptations of works by Walter Scott